Laurent Lolesio Fuahea (5 September 1927 – 2 December 2011) was the Roman Catholic bishop of the Diocese of Wallis et Futuna from 1974 until 2005. Fuahea was born in Hihifo, Wallis and became the bishop in the Roman Catholic Church on 16 July 1972. He was ordained a priest in 1957 and succeeded Michel-Maurice-Augustin-Marie Darmancier as bishop of Wallis and Futuna on 25 April 1974. He was succeeded by Ghislain Marie Raoul Suzanne de Rasilly.

Notes

External links
Diocese of Wallis et Futuna, Wallis and Futuna

1927 births
2011 deaths
20th-century Roman Catholic bishops in Oceania
21st-century Roman Catholic bishops in Oceania
Wallis and Futuna Roman Catholic bishops
Roman Catholic bishops of Wallis et Futuna